Pleistocene rewilding is the advocacy of the reintroduction of extant Pleistocene megafauna, or the close ecological equivalents of extinct megafauna. It is an extension of the conservation practice of rewilding, which involves reintroducing species to areas where they became extinct in recent history (hundreds of years ago or less).

Towards the end of the Pleistocene era (roughly 13,000 to 10,000 years ago), nearly all megafauna of Eurasia, Australia, and South/North America, dwindled towards extinction, in what has been referred to as the Quaternary extinction event. With the loss of large herbivores and predator species, niches important for ecosystem functioning were left unoccupied. In the words of the biologist Tim Flannery, "ever since the extinction of the megafauna 13,000 years ago, the continent has had a seriously unbalanced fauna". This means, for example, that the managers of national parks in North America have to resort to culling to keep the population of ungulates under control.

Paul S. Martin (originator of the Pleistocene overkill hypothesis) states that present ecological communities in North America do not function appropriately in the absence of megafauna, because much of the native flora and fauna evolved under the influence of large mammals.

Ecological and evolutionary implications 

Research shows that species interactions play a pivotal role in conservation efforts. Communities where species evolved in response to Pleistocene megafauna (but now lack large mammals) may be in danger of collapse. Most living megafauna are threatened or endangered; extant megafauna have a significant impact on the communities they occupy, which supports the idea that communities evolved in response to large mammals. Pleistocene rewilding could "serve as additional refugia to help preserve that evolutionary potential" of megafauna. Reintroducing megafauna to North America could preserve current megafauna, while filling ecological niches that have been vacant since the Pleistocene.

Climate implications 

Sergey Zimov, a Russian scientist and proponent of Pleistocene rewilding, argues that it could restore the mammoth steppe ecosystem and in doing so slow the melting of the Arctic permafrost and give the world more time to respond to climate change. He holds that the mammoth steppe collapsed because of overhunting by humans rather than natural climate change, and has established Pleistocene Park in Siberia and Wild Field in European Russia to test grassland restoration through reintroducing mammoth steppe animals and proxies for them.

Possible fauna for reintroduction (North America) 

Pleistocene rewilding aims at the promotion of extant fauna and the reintroduction of extinct genera in the southwestern and central United States. Native fauna are the first genera proposed for reintroduction. The Bolson tortoise was widespread during the Pleistocene era, and continued to be common during the Holocene epoch until recent times. Its reintroduction from northern Mexico would be a necessary step to recreate the soil humidity present in the Pleistocene, which would support grassland and extant shrub-land and provide the habitat required for the herbivores set for reintroduction. Other large tortoise species might later be introduced to fill the role of various species of Hesperotestudo. However, to be successful, ecologists must first support fauna already present in the region.

The pronghorn, which is extant in most of the west after almost becoming extinct, is crucial to the revival of the ancient ecosystem. Pronghorns are native to the region, which once supported large numbers of the species and extinct relatives of the same family. It would occupy the great plains and other arid regions of the west and southwest.

The plains bison and the wood bison numbered in the millions during the Pleistocene and most of the Holocene, until European settlers drove them to near-extinction in the late 19th century. The plains bison has made a recovery in many regions of its former range, and is involved in several local rewilding projects across the Midwestern United States.

Distributions of some of today's arctic species and their relatives were much broader during the late Pleistocene and the Holocene; reindeer reached as far as southern United States, and close relatives of muskox (Bootherium and Euceratherium) extended to southern United States and Mexico. Hence reindeer and muskox might be able to inhabit northern portions of central North America.

Bighorn sheep and mountain goats are already present in the surrounding mountainous areas and therefore should not pose a problem in rewilding more mountainous areas. Mountain goats are already being introduced to areas formerly occupied by Oreamnos haringtoni, a more southern relative that went extinct at the end of the Pleistocene. Reintroducing extant species of deer to the more forested areas of the region would be beneficial for the ecosystems they occupy, providing rich nutrients for the forested regions and helping to maintain them. These species include elk, white-tailed and mule deer.

Herbivorous species considered beneficial for the regional ecosystems include the collared peccary, a species of pig-like ungulate that was abundant in the Pleistocene. Although this species (along with the flat-headed and long-nosed peccaries) is extinct in many regions of North America, their relatives survive in Central and South America and the collared peccary can still be found in southern Arizona, New Mexico, and Texas. The Chacoan peccary, which is morphologically very similar to the flat-headed peccary, might be able to replace it in areas of the Great Plains and the South.

Horses originated in North America and spread to Asia via the Ice Age land bridge, but became extinct in their evolutionary homeland alongside the mammoth and ground sloth. The Pleistocene grasslands of North America were the birthplace of the modern horse, and by extension the wild horse. North America already has feral populations of Mustang and Burro. Przewalski's horses are well adapted to arid and grassland regions and could be introduced as a substitute for their close North American relative, Scott's horse. The stilt-legged horses might be approximated by the morphologically similar onagers, kiangs, and asses. Animals that would serve as predators of these equine species would include lions and wolves.

Alongside the wild horse, camels evolved in the drier regions of North America. Although camelids are extinct in North America, they have survived in South America until today: the guanaco and vicuña, and domesticated llama and alpaca. North America links the South American camelids with those of the Old World (the Dromedary, Bactrian camel and wild Bactrian camel). Pleistocene rewilding suggests that the closest relatives of the North American species of camelid be reintroduced. The candidates would be Old World camels as a proxy for Camelops, and New World camelids as a proxies for smaller species of both Hemiauchenia and Palaeolama. These species would live in the arid regions and grasslands of North America. Although small in numbers, there are feral or semi-feral camelids in North America such as Dromedary in Texas and its vicinity and llamas among Hoh Rainforest on the Olympic Peninsula. Free-ranging camels face predators typical of their regional distribution, which include wolves and lions. The main predator of guanacos and vicuñas is the cougar.

During the Pleistocene, a species of tapir existed in North America with many regional variants. They became extinct at the end of the Pleistocene era, but their relatives survive in Asia and South America. The mountain tapir would be an excellent choice for rewilding humid areas, such as those near lakes and rivers. The mountain tapir is the only extant non-tropical species of tapir. Predators of mountain tapirs include cougars, bears, and, less commonly, jaguars. Good introduction areas might include forested ecosystems of the west and east coasts, and the more scrub-like or wetland ecosystem of the south.

During the Pleistocene, large populations of Proboscideans lived in North America, such as the Columbian mammoth and the American mastodon. The mastodons all became extinct at the end of the Pleistocene era, as did the mammoths of North America. However, an extant relative of the mammoth is the Asian elephant. It now resides only in tropical southeastern Asia, but the fossil record shows that it was much more widespread, living in temperate northern China as well as the Middle East (an area bearing an ecological similarity to the southern and central United States). The Asian elephant is possibly a good candidate for Pleistocene rewilding in North America. Asian elephants would do well in the environments previously occupied by the Columbian mammoth. African elephants have also been suggested for introduction into North America.

Several species of capybaras were present in North America until the late Pleistocene. Today, feral population(s) of capybara inhabit Florida while breeding has not been confirmed yet. These feral animals potentially fill ecological niches of extinct capybaras, and further surveys are recommended. 

Pleistocene America boasted a wide variety of dangerous carnivores (most of which are extinct today), such as the short-faced bear, saber-toothed cats (e.g. Homotherium), the American lion, dire wolf, and the American cheetah. Some carnivores and omnivores survived the end of the Pleistocene era and were widespread in North America until Europeans arrived, such as grizzly bears, cougars, jaguars, grey and red wolves, bobcats, and coyotes. The cheetah could serve as a substitute for Miracinonyx, keeping the population of pronghorns in check. Jaguars could be reintroduced back to areas of North America to control populations of prey animals. Some of the larger cats such as the African lion could act as a proxy for the Pleistocene American lion, they could be introduced to keep the numbers of American bison, equids, and camelids in check.

Criticism 
The main criticism of the Pleistocene rewilding is that it is unrealistic to assume that communities today are functionally similar to their state 10,000 years ago. Opponents argue that there has been more than enough time for communities to evolve in the absence of mega-fauna, and thus the reintroduction of large mammals could thwart ecosystem dynamics and possibly cause collapse. Under this argument, the prospective taxa for reintroduction are considered exotic and could potentially harm natives of North America through invasion, disease, or other factors.

Opponents of the Pleistocene rewilding present an alternative conservation program, in which more recent North American natives will be reintroduced into parts of their native ranges where they became extinct during historical times. Another way of rewilding Americas, Asia, etc. is by using de-extinction, bringing extinct species back to life through cloning.

Pleistocene rewilding in Europe 
This plan was considered by Josh Donlan and Jens-C. Svenning, and involves (as in rewilding North America) creating a Pleistocene habitat in portions of Europe. Svenning claims that "Pleistocene Rewilding can be taken for consideration outside of North America".  Incidentally, an independent "Rewilding Europe" initiative was established in the Netherlands in 2011, with the western Iberian Peninsula, Velebit, the Danube delta and the eastern and southern Carpathians as particular targets.

The proxies which may be used for this project(s) are:

Animals which have already been introduced 

Fallow deer, reintroduced from Anatolia in most parts of Europe already in Ancient times.
Mouflon, reintroduced for hunting purposes in the continent from the island populations of Corsica and Sardinia (originated in turn by introductions from the Middle East during the Neolithic period).
Musk ox, reintroduced in 1976 to Russia (Taimyr Peninsula and Wrangel Island) and Scandinavia.
European bison, saved from extinction in zoos in the early 20th century and reintroduced in several places of Eastern Europe.
Northern bald ibis, extinct in southern Europe during the Modern Age, has reintroduction projects underway in Austria and Spain.
Water buffalo, reintroduced in several areas including Danube Delta (present in the Danube basin in the early Holocene period and a proxy for the similar Bubalus murrensis which was widespread in southern Europe during the warmer periods of the Pleistocene; domestic populations exist in Italy and the Balkans).
Alpine marmot, reintroduced with success in the Pyrenees in 1948, where it had disappeared at end of the Pleistocene epoch.

Animals with existing populations in Europe that are expanding
Alpine ibex
Spanish ibex
Chamois
Moose
Wolf
Eurasian lynx
Iberian lynx
Brown bear
European mink
Mediterranean monk seal
European beaver
Osprey
White-tailed eagle
Griffon vulture
Eurasian black vulture
Eurasian eagle owl

Species that became extinct in the historic past but still exist as domestic descendants 
 A number of primitive horse races including Konik, Heck horse, Dülmener, Norwegian Fjord Horse, Exmoor pony, Pottoka, Losino horse, Sorraia, Marismeño, as a proxy for the tarpan. Przewalski horse, a subspecies native of Mongolia and the only remaining wild horse in the world, has also been introduced in Ukraine, Hungary and France.
 Robust cattle breeds or a combination of them as a proxy for the extinct aurochs. The Dutch-based TaurOs Project aims to reconstitute the aurochs by crossbreeding Sayaguesa, Maremmana primitivo, Pajuna, Limia, Maronesa, Podolica, Tudanca and Highland cattle, while Heck cattle and Galloway cattle have already been used in grazing projects.

Species still extant outside Europe 

 Asian black bear (Until the late Pleistocene, Europe had two subspecies of its own, Ursus thibetanus mediterraneus in western Europe and the Caucasus as well as Ursus thibetanus permjak in eastern Europe, especially the Ural mountains)
 Asian elephant (Proxy for the extinct Straight-tusked elephant, also historically present in Turkey. The Randers Tropical Zoo in Denmark plans on using Asian elephants on a small scale local rewilding project)
Northern lion (Widespread in Europe during the Pleistocene. In historical times in southeastern Europe, ranging as far as Hungary. Can also serve as a proxy for the extinct European cave lion.)
 Dhole (Occurred during Late-Glacial Period)
 Dromedary camel (could act as a proxy for the extinct European camels)
 Hippopotamus (Occurred in Europe during the Pleistocene; suitable in warmer parts of Europe)
 Onager (also recently extinct in Eastern Europe)
 Persian leopard (Leopards thrived in Europe until the end of the Pleistocene and are still present in the Caucasus.)
 Saiga antelope (present in Eastern Europe until recently)
 Spotted hyena (Last occurrence during the Late-Glacial Period)
Sumatran rhinoceros (The closest living relative of European rhinoceros lineages. If saved from extinction, this species could possibly replace the extinct Merck's rhinoceros, but if Sumatran rhinos go extinct, the White rhinoceros could be used instead to replace Merck's rhinoceros)

Northern Siberia

The aim of Siberian Pleistocene rewilding is to recreate the ancient mammoth steppe by reintroducing megafauna. The first step was the successful reintroduction of musk oxen on the Taymyr Peninsula and Wrangel island. In 1988, researcher Sergey Zimov created Pleistocene Park – a nature reserve in northeastern Siberia for full-scale megafauna rewilding. Reindeer, Siberian roe deer and moose were already present; Yakutian horses, muskox, Altai wapiti and wisent were reintroduced. Reintroduction is also planned for yak, Bactrian camels, snow sheep, Saiga antelope, and Siberian tigers.

The wood bison, the closest relative of the ancient bison which became extinct in Siberia 1,000 to 2,000 years ago, is an important species for the ecology of Siberia. In 2006, 30 bison calves were flown from Edmonton, Alberta to Yakutsk. Now they live in the government-run Ust'-Buotama reserve.

Animals that have already been introduced 

Bactrian camel 
Domestic Yak Six domestic yak were brought to Pleistocene Park in 2017. It turned out that two of the Yaks were pregnant so now there are eight Yak in Pleistocene Park.
Musk ox (became extinct in Siberia about 2000 years ago, but has been reintroduced in Taimyr Peninsula and on Wrangel Island)
Wood bison (As a proxy for the extinct Steppe bison)
Yakutian horse (A group of these horses were brought to Pleistocene Park to replace the extinct horses)

Considered for reintroduction

Saiga antelope (occurred in many parts of Siberia until recently, now restricted to Chyornye Zemli Nature Reserve)
Siberian roe deer (could be brought back by both introductions and migrations)
Siberian tiger (occurred up to Beringia during the late Pleistocene, now restricted to southeastern Siberia)
Snow sheep (could be brought back to many parts of Siberia through both introductions and migrations)

Asia

Animals that have already been introduced 

 Korean fox in Sobaeksan National Park and DMZ, South Korea
 Asian black bear in Jirisan National Park, South Korea
 Père David's deer in China

Considered for reintroduction 

 Amur tiger in various areas including Iran (also as a proxy for Caspian tiger)
 South China tiger (Save China's Tigers aims to restore the subspecies to its former range)
 California sea lion (as a proxy for Japanese sea lion)
 Gray wolf in South Korea
 Ussuri dhole in South Korea

Island landmasses 
Megafauna that arose on insular landmasses were especially vulnerable to human influence because they evolved in isolation from other landmasses, and thus were not subjected to the same selection pressures that surviving fauna were subject to, and many forms of insular megafauna were wiped out after the arrival of humans. Therefore, scientists have suggested introducing closely related taxa to replace the extinct taxa. This is being done on several islands, with replacing closely related or ecologically functional giant tortoises to replace extinct giant tortoises. For example, the Aldabra giant tortoise has been suggested for replacing the extinct Malagasy giant tortoises, and Malagasy radiated tortoises have been introduced to Mauritius to replace the tortoises that were present there. However, the usage of tortoises in rewilding experiments have not been limited to replacing extinct tortoises. At the Makauwahi Cave Reserve in Hawaii, exotic tortoises are being used as a replacement for the extinct moa-nalo, a large flightless duck hunted to extinction by the first Polynesians to reach Hawaii. The grazing habits of these tortoises control and reduce the spread of invasive plants, and promote the growth of native flora.

Australia

Animals that have already been introduced
 Tasmanian devil (to New South Wales)

Expanding populations 

 Koala
 Common wombat
 Northern hairy-nosed wombat
 Southern hairy-nosed wombat
 Eastern wallaroo
 Southern cassowary
 Southern elephant seal (major colonies exist on Macquarie Island and Heard Island and McDonald Islands with smaller breeding areas on Browning Peninsula and Peterson Island on Antarctic territory and Maatsuyker Islands in southern Tasmania, occasional visitors to main continent, the first individual returned to King Island in 2015 since 1800s)

Extant outside Australia 

 Western long-beaked echidna (specimen collected in the early 20th century in the Kimberley region of Western Australia, a possible relic population continues to exist there)
 Dwarf cassowary
 Northern cassowary
 Komodo dragon (also potentially serves as proxy for Megalania)
 New Zealand pigeon (endemic race was exterminated on Lord Howe Island)
 New Zealand kaka (proxy for the Norfolk kaka that was exterminated on Norfolk Island)

Considered for reintroduction 

 Australian sea lion (possible reintroduction to Bass Strait)
 Emu on Tasmania and adjacent islands (serves as a proxy for Tasmanian emu, King Island emu, and Kangaroo Island emu)

Introduced species as alternative proxy for extinct fauna 
There have been discussions that introduced exotic faunas, most notably the Dromedary camel as proxy for Diprotodon and Palorchestes, may fill empty niches of extinct faunas hence some promote conservation of these animals rather than eradication.

British Isles

Animals that have already been introduced (including semi-wild animals)

Eurasian beaver
Eurasian elk 
European bison in West Blean and Thornden Woods (5 animals including a calf born in 2022)
Horse such as Exmoor pony
Reindeer in Cairngorms National Park
Wild boar

Considered for reintroduction 

 Gray whale

Japan

Animals that have already been introduced 

 Crested ibis on Sado Island in Japan  
 Eurasian otter on Tsushima (unclear whether or not its reintroduction was natural)
 Oriental stork in western Japan

Considered for reintroduction 

 Dugong (to save functionally extinct, northernmost population)
 Eurasian wolf (as a proxy for Japanese wolf and Hokkaido wolf, and several attempts had been proposed to introduce it in Shiretoko, Nikko, and Bungo-ōno, but it is a highly controversial topic)。

Madagascar

Animals that have already been introduced 

 Aldabra giant tortoise

Maritime Southeast Asia

Considered for reintroduction 

 Malayan tapir (a proxy for giant tapir on Java, but prehistoric occurrence of tapir on Borneo is debated)
 Visayan warty pig (a proxy for Cebu warty pig)

Sri Lanka

Considered for reintroduction 

 Gaur

Wrangel Island

Animals that have already been introduced 
 Muskox
 Reindeer

See also 

 De-extinction
 Endangered species
 List of introduced species
 Mustang
 Pleistocene Park
 Quaternary extinction event
 Evolutionary anachronism
 Rewilding Institute
 Species reintroduction
 Free-roaming horse management in North America

References

External links 
 Mauro Galetti
 Paulo Guimarães Jr.
 Pedro Jordano
 The Rewilding Institute
 C. Josh Donlan
 Re-wilding North America
 Rewilding Megafauna: Lions and Camels in North America?
 Pleistocene Park Could Solve Mystery of Mammoth's Extinction
 Pleistocene Rewilding merits serious consideration also outside North America for Rewilding Europe
 Megafauna: First Victims of the Human-Caused Extinction

Pleistocene animals
Pleistocene extinctions
Prehistoric mammals of North America
Extinct animals of the United States
Animal reintroduction
Rewilding